Palmetto Bay is located on the southeast coast of Barbados, between Bottom Bay and Kitridge Bay.

Bays of Barbados